The Pisa University System is a network of higher education institutions in Pisa, Italy. The following three schools and universities belong to the system:

 Scuola Normale Superiore di Pisa
 Sant'Anna School of Advanced Studies
 University of Pisa

International rankings
According to the Academic Ranking of World Universities, Italy Rankings:

 The Academic Ranking of World Universities puts Pisa University System at the first place in Italy (National Rank # 1) and within the best 30 universities in Europe.
 As part of the Pisa University System, Sant'Anna School of Advanced Studies has also been mapped by Times Higher Education-QS World University Rankings as one of the most important educational institutions in Italy (section on Italy i.e. Top universities and specialisms ), having its Graduate/Postgraduate Profile.
 Also, Sant'Anna School of Advanced Studies together with Scuola Normale Superiore are named as leading institutions in <ref>Italy's six top higher education institutes by Times Higher Education World University Rankings.</ref>
 According to QS World University Rankings, Sant'Anna School of Advanced Studies is part of the initiative Invest Your Talent in Italy which puts Italian graduate programmes on the world's stage.
 The European Research Ranking, a ranking based on publicly available data from the European Commission database puts Pisa University System among the best in Italy and best performing European research institutions.
La Voce, published a ranking of Italian universities by h-index, where Sant'Anna School of Advanced Studies acquires the first (#1) place in Italy.

Notable alumni and faculty 

I. Scuola Normale Superiore di Pisa

 Enrico Fermi, physicist and Nobel prize winner
 Carlo Rubbia, physicist and Nobel prize winner
 Giosuè Carducci, poet and Nobel prize winner
 Luigi Bianchi, mathematician
 Lamberto Cesari, mathematician
 Carlo Azeglio Ciampi, economist and politician, former Governor of the Banca d'Italia, former Prime Minister of Italy, former President of the Italian Republic, life senator
 Massimo D'Alema (withdrew), politician, former Italian Prime Minister and Minister of Foreign Affairs
 Guido Fubini, mathematician
 Giovanni Gentile, philosopher and politician
 Carlo Ginzburg, historian
 Ennio De Giorgi, mathematician, solved the 19th Hilbert problem, won Wolf Prize (1990)
 Giovanni Gronchi, politician, former President of the Republic of Italy
 Fabio Mussi (withdrew), politician, former Italian Minister of the University
 Leonida Tonelli, mathematician
 Vito Volterra, mathematician
 Giancarlo Wick, physicist
 Riccardo Barbieri, physicist
 Riccardo Rattazzi, physicist
 Jiyuan Yu, philosopher

II. Sant'Anna School of Advanced Studies

 Giuliano Amato, Prime Minister of Italy ( 1992–1993 and 2000–2001), Vice President of the Convention on the Future of Europe that drafted the new European Constitution and headed the Amato Group.
 Antonio Cassese, first President of the International Criminal Tribunal For the Former Yugoslavia (ICTY)(1993–1997), in 2004 appointed by United Nations Secretary General Kofi Annan to be the Chairperson for the International Commission of Inquiry on Darfur
 Sabino Cassese, Professor of Administrative Law and a judge of the Constitutional Court of Italy
 Pier Francesco Guarguaglini, former president of Finmeccanica (since 2017 Leonardo)
 Enrico Letta, elected to the Italian Chamber of Deputies, Deputy Secretary of the Democratic Party (Italy), Prime Minister of Italy from April 2013 to February 2014
 Antonio Maccanico, number of times appointed as Minister in the Italian Republic
 Marcello Spatafora, Italian Ambassador to Malaysia (1980–1986), Ambassador to Malta (1986–1989), Ambassador to Australia (1993–1997), Ambassador to Albania (1997–1999), Chief of the Italian delegation responsible for organizing the country's presidency of the European Economic Community (1989–1990), as of 2000 Permanent Representative of Italy to the United Nations, President of the United Nations Security Council in 2007
 Tiziano Terzani, Italian journalist and writer
 Vittorio Grilli, Deputy Minister of the Ministry of Economy and Finance (government of Mario Monti), part of the Board of Directors of Sant'Anna School of Advanced Studies, and board-member of the respected European think-thank Bruegel (institution)
 Riccardo Varaldo, economist and holder of the Cavaliere di Gran Croce dell'Ordine al Merito della Repubblica i.e. Order of Merit of the Italian Republic, President of Sant'Anna School of Advanced Studies of Pisa, Member of many Ministries' entities, President of the Società Italiana di Marketing
 Nicola Bellini, economist and Director of IRPET (Istituto Regionale per la Programmazione Economica della Toscana)
 Giovanni Dosi, economist, co-director of the specific task forces on industrial policy and intellectual property rights within the Initiative for Policy Dialogue, editor of the Oxford University Press Journal Continental Europe of Industrial and Corporate Change
 Stefan Collignon, professor of political economy, International Chief Economist of the Centro Europa Ricerche, founder of Euro Asia Forum at Sant'Anna School of Advanced Studies. Previously, he was Centennial Professor of European Political Economy at the London School of Economics and Political Science (LSE) (2001–2005) and Visiting Professor at Harvard University (2005–2007) also taught at University of Hamburg, Institut d’Etudes Politiques, College of Europe and at the Free University of Berlin. Also served as Deputy Director General for Europe in the Federal Ministry of Finance (Germany) 1999 - 2000.
 Marco Frey, Professor of Business Administration and Director of the Institute of Management at Sant'Anna School of Advanced Studies and Research Director at Centre for Research on Energy and Environmental Economics and Policy at Bocconi University
 Fabio Iraldo, Professor of Business Administration, Sant'Anna School of Advanced Studies, Pisa, Italy and Director of Research Center at Bocconi University
 Alberto Di Minin, Professor of Business Administration, Institute of Management at Sant'Anna School of Advanced Studies and BRIE - Berkeley Roundtable on the International Economy, University of California, Berkeley
 Francesca Gino, Professor of Business Administration, Harvard Business School
 Francesco Strazzari, Professor of Political Science, Sant'Anna School of Advanced Studies and the Paul H. Nitze School of Advanced International Studies at Johns Hopkins University
 Mikhail Anufriev, Professor of Economics, University of Amsterdam
 Anna Bassi, Professor of Political Science, University of North Carolina at Chapel Hill
 Michele Berardi, Professor of Economics, University of Manchester
 Matteo Barigozzi, Professor of Economics, London School of Economics and Political Science
 Carolina Castaldi, Professor of Economics, University of Utrecht
 Marco Giarratana, Professor of Business Administration, Charles III University of Madrid
 Mauro Napoletano, Professor of Economics, Institut d'Études Politiques de Paris
 Cinzia Daraio, Professor of Business Administration, University of Bologna
 Antonio L'Abbate, Professor of Medical Sciences at Sant'Anna School of Advanced Studies and together with Giovanni Dosi one of the top Italian Scientists
 Giorgio Buttazzo, Professor at Sant'Anna School of Advanced Studies, Editor-in-Chief of the Journal of Real-Time Systems (Springer) and Chair of the IEEE Technical Committee on Real-Time Systems

III. University of Pisa

 Galileo Galilei, Italian physicist, mathematician, astronomer, and philosopher who played a major role in the Scientific Revolution. His achievements include improvements to the telescope and consequent astronomical observations and support for Copernicanism.  Galileo has been called the "father of modern observational astronomy", the "father of modern physics", the "father of science", and "the Father of Modern Science". According to Stephen Hawking, "Galileo, perhaps more than any other single person, was responsible for the birth of modern science".
 Enrico Fermi, physicist, 1938 Nobel Prize in Physics for his work on induced radioactivity, particularly known for his work on the development of the first nuclear reactor, Chicago Pile-1, and for his contributions to the development of quantum theory, nuclear and particle physics, and statistical mechanics. Fermi is widely regarded as one of the leading scientists of the 20th century, highly accomplished in both theory and experiment. Along with J. Robert Oppenheimer, he is frequently referred to as "the father of the atomic bomb" also studied at the Scuola Normale Superiore i.e. Pisa University System
 Carlo Rubbia, Knight Grand Cross particle physicist and inventor who shared the Nobel Prize in Physics in 1984 with Simon van der Meer for work leading to the discovery of the W and Z particles at CERN, also studied at the Scuola Normale Superiore i.e. Pisa University System
 Francesco Accarigi, professor of civil law
 Giuliano Amato, politician and former Prime Minister of Italy, also studied at the Collegio Medico-Giuridico of the Scuola Normale Superiore, which today is Sant'Anna School of Advanced Studies i.e. Pisa University System
 Andrea Bocelli, tenor, multi-instrumentalist and classical crossover artist
 Andrea Camilleri, writer (ad honorem)
 Giosuè Carducci, poet, 1906 Nobel Prize in Literature
 Bonaventura Cavalieri, mathematician, known for his work on the problems of optics and motion, work on the precursors of infinitesimal calculus, and the introduction of logarithms to Italy.  Cavalieri's principle in geometry partially anticipated integral calculus
 Carlo Azeglio Ciampi, 73rd Prime Minister of Italy from 1993 to 1994 and was the tenth President of the Italian Republic from 1999 to 2006. Until his death, he served as Senator for life in the Italian Senate, also studied at the Scuola Normale Superiore i.e. Pisa University System
 Pope Clement XII, 17th century Pope i.e. Bishop of Rome, a position that makes him the leader of the worldwide Catholic Church (which is composed of the Latin Rite and the Eastern Catholic Churches in full communion with the see of Rome), regarded as the successor of Saint Peter, the Apostle
 Massimo D'Alema, politician and former 77th Prime Minister from 1998 to 2000, and later he was Deputy Prime Minister and Minister of Foreign Affairs from 2006 to 2008, also studied at the Scuola Normale Superiore i.e. Pisa University System
 Giovanni Gentile, minister and neo-Hegelian Idealist philosopher, a peer of Benedetto Croce, described himself as 'the philosopher of Fascism', and ghostwrote A Doctrine of Fascism (1932) for Benito Mussolini, also devised his own system of philosophy, Actual Idealism, and Professor at the Scuola Normale Superiore i.e. Pisa University System
 Giovanni Gronchi, former President of the Italian Republic
 Girolamo Maggi, 16th century scholar
 Guido Fubini, mathematician
 Mario Monicelli, movie director
 Alessandro Natta, former secretary of the Italian Communist Party (PCI)
 René Préval, President of Haiti
 Carlo Sforza, President of the Italian National Consult, Italian Minister of Foreign Affairs
 Adriano Sofri, writer
 Tiziano Terzani, journalist and writer
 Elio Toaff, former Chief Rabbi of Rome
 Andrea Vaccá Berlinghieri, 19th century surgeon
 Vito Volterra, mathematician and physicist, known for his contributions to mathematical biology and integral equations.
 François Carlo Antommarchi, Napoleon's physician from 1818 to his death in 1821.
 Stefano Arduini, scholar of linguistics, rhetoric, semiotics and translation
 Adolfo Bartoli, physicist, who is best known for introducing the concept of radiation pressure from thermodynamical considerations
 Enrico Betti, mathematician, now remembered mostly for his 1871 paper on topology that led to the later naming after him of the Betti numbers
 Luciano Bianciardi, journalist, translator and writer of short stories and novels
 Emilio Bizzi, neuroscientist and Institute Professor at the Massachusetts Institute of Technology
 Sandro Bondi, politician, Culture Minister in Silvio Berlusconi's fourth cabinet
 Cesare Borgia, Duke of Romagna, Prince of Andria and Venafro, Count of Dyois, Lord of Piombino, Camerino and Urbino, Gonfalonier and Captain General of the Church, an Italian condottiero, nobleman, politician, and cardinal. He was the son of Pope Alexander VI and his long-term mistress Vannozza dei Cattanei
 Philippe Buonarroti, 18th century egalitarian and utopian socialist, revolutionary, journalist, writer, agitator, and freemason; he was mainly active in France
 Piero Calamandrei, author, jurist, soldier, university professor and politician, one of Italy's leading authorities on the law of civil procedure
 Francesco Cappè, United Nations official and Head, Security Governance/Counter-Terrorism for the United Nations Interregional Crime and Justice Research Institute (UNICRI) a member of the UN Counter-Terrorism Implementation Task Force (CTITF) of the UN General Assembly.
 Adán Cárdenas, President of Nicaragua between 1 March 1883 and 1 March 1887.
 Antonio Cassese, jurist who specialized in public international law, President of the Special Tribunal for Lebanon, also studied at the Collegio Medico-Giuridico of the Scuola Normale Superiore, which today is Sant'Anna School of Advanced Studies i.e. Pisa University System
 Sabino Cassese, Professor of Administrative Law and a judge of the Constitutional Court of Italy, also studied at the Collegio Medico-Giuridico of the Scuola Normale Superiore, which today is Sant'Anna School of Advanced Studies i.e. Pisa University System
 Benedetto Castelli, mathematician
 Carlo Chiti, Italian racing car and engine designer, best known for his long association with Alfa Romeo's racing department
 Mauro Cristofani, linguist and researcher in Etruscan studies
 Luigi Fantappiè, mathematician, known for work in mathematical analysis and for creating the theory of analytic functionals: he was a student and follower of Vito Volterra, also proposed scientific theories of sweeping scope
 Lando Ferretti, journalist, politician and sports administrator
 Clara Franzini-Armstrong, FMRS an American electron microscopist, and Professor Emeritus of Cell and Developmental Biology at University of Pennsylvania.
 Luca Gammaitoni, scientist in the area of noise and nonlinear dynamics
 David Levi (Italy), Italian-Jewish poet and patriot
 Lorenzo Magalotti, philosopher, author, diplomat and poet
 Paolo Malanima, Italian economic historian
 Alessandro Natta, politician and secretary of the Italian Communist Party (PCI) from 1984 to 1988
 Jože Pirjevec, Slovene historian from Italy, one of the most prominent diplomatic historians of the west Balkans region, and member of the Slovenian Academy of Sciences and Arts
 Francesco Redi, 17th century physician, naturalist, and poet
 Giovanni Battista Rinuccini, Roman Catholic archbishop in the mid seventeenth century
 Luigi Rizzi (linguist), linguist
 Giovanni Salvemini, FRS, 18th century mathematician and astronomer
 Atto Tigri, 19th century anatomist

External links
 Official website

See also 
List of Italian universities

References 

Education in Pisa
Universities in Italy